The 1980 All-Big Eight Conference football team consists of American football players chosen by various organizations for All-Big Eight Conference teams for the 1980 NCAA Division I-A football season.  The selectors for the 1980 season included the Associated Press (AP).

Offensive selections

Quarterbacks
 Phil Bradley, Missouri (AP)

Running backs
 Jarvis Redwine, Nebraska (AP)
 Kerwin Bell, Kansas (AP)
 Dwayne Crutchfield, Iowa State (AP)

Tight ends
 Forrest Valora, Oklahoma (AP)

Wide receivers
 David Verser, Kansas (AP)

Centers
 Brad Edelman, Missouri (AP)

Offensive guards
 Randy Schleusener, Nebraska (AP)
 Terry Crouch, Oklahoma (AP)

Offensive tackles
 Howard Richards, Missouri (AP)
 Louis Oubre, Oklahoma (AP)

Defensive selections

Defensive ends
 Derrie Nelson, Nebraska (AP)
 James Walker, Kansas State (AP)

Defensive tackles
 Richard Turner, Oklahoma (AP)
 David Clark, Nebraska (AP)

Nose guards
 Stan Gardner, Kansas (AP)

Linebackers
 Ricky Young, Oklahoma State (AP)
 Lester Dickey, Missouri (AP)

Defensive backs
 Eric Wright, Missouri (AP)
 Russell Gary, Nebraska (AP)
 Larry Crawford, Iowa State (AP)
 Bill Whitaker, Missouri (AP)

Special teams

Place-kicker
 Ron Verrilli, Missouri (AP)

Punter
 Bucky Scribner, Kansas (AP)

Key

AP = Associated Press

See also
 1980 College Football All-America Team

References

All-Big Seven Conference football team
All-Big Eight Conference football teams